The Maurice River) is a tributary of Delaware Bay in Salem County and Cumberland County, New Jersey in the United States. The river was named for Maurice, Prince of Orange.

Watershed and course
The Maurice River, pronounced "MAW-ris," is approximately 50 miles long with a drainage area of 386 square miles (1,000 km2). It is the second longest and second largest tributary to Delaware Bay.  Its watershed includes an extensive southern portion of the coastal forested wetlands known as the Pine Barrens. Its mouth on Delaware Bay is surrounded by extensive salt marshes and has provided a historically important oystering ground.

South of Millville it becomes navigable, forming a  estuary that empties into Maurice River Cove on Delaware Bay. The estuary is joined from the northeast by Menantico Creek, the Manumuskin River, and Muskee Creek.

Water quality and stewardship
The river is considered especially pristine for the region, forming a critical ecological link between the Pine Barrens and the Delaware Bay systems, except that the State Of New Jersey advises against eating more than 8 ounces of fish caught in the river in any week or month, depending on the species, for the general population and advises against eating any fish from the Maurice River for the High Risk population.  It is the location of one of the few stands of wild rice in New Jersey, and provides habitat for 53 percent of the species in New Jersey designated as endangered. In 1993, Congress designated  of the river and its tributaries as the Maurice National Scenic and Recreational River, as part of the National Wild and Scenic Rivers program.

A local nonprofit organization, Citizens United to Protect the Maurice River and Its Tributaries, Inc., is a regional watershed organization that focuses its work on the Maurice River watershed, from Willow Grove Lake southward. The South Jersey Land and Water Trust focuses on the northern portion of the watershed, from Willow Grove Lake northward.

Tributaries
 Menantico Creek
 Manumuskin River
 Muddy Run

See also
 List of New Jersey rivers

References

External links
 Wild and Scenic Maurice River
 National Park Service: Maurice Wild and Scenic River
 U.S. Geological Survey: NJ stream gaging stations
 

Tributaries of Delaware Bay
Rivers in the Pine Barrens (New Jersey)
Rivers of New Jersey
Rivers of Cumberland County, New Jersey
Rivers of Salem County, New Jersey
Wild and Scenic Rivers of the United States